Mahonia imbricata is a shrub in the family Berberidaceae, first described in 2001. It is endemic to China, known from Guizhou and Yunnan Provinces.

References

imbricata
Endemic flora of China
Plants described in 2001